Boreotrophon kamchatkanus is a species of sea snail, a marine gastropod mollusk in the family Muricidae, the murex snails or rock snails.

Description

Distribution
This marine species occurs off the Kamchatka Peninsula.

References

 Egorov R.V. 1994. New data on the taxonomy of molluscs of the family Trophoninae (Gastropoda, Muricidae) from the northwestern Pacific. Ruthenica 4(2): 97-101
 Houart R. & Moffitt R. (2010). A new Scabrotrophon (Gastropoda: Muricidae) from Hawaii and discussion about the generic classification of Boreotrophon kamchatkanus Dall, 1902, a related species. The Nautilus 124(2):112–116

External links
 Dall, W. H. (1902). Illustrations and descriptions of new, unfigured, or imperfectly known shells, chiefly American in the U. S. National Museum. Proceedings of the United States National Museum. 24 (1264): 499-566, pls 27-40
 Houart, R.; Vermeij, G.; Wiedrick, S. (2019). New taxa and new synonymy in Muricidae (Neogastropoda: Pagodulinae, Trophoninae, Ocenebrinae) from the Northeast Pacific. Zoosymposia. 13(1): 184-241

Gastropods described in 1902
Boreotrophon